Spirituality in Clinical Practice is a quarterly peer-reviewed academic journal published by the American Psychological Association covering research on the role of spirituality in psychotherapy. The editors-in-chief are Lisa Miller, (Columbia University) and Len Sperry (Florida Atlantic University).

Abstracting and indexing 
The journal is abstracted and indexed by PsycINFO.

See also 
 List of psychology journals

External links 
 

American Psychological Association academic journals
Quarterly journals
English-language journals
Publications established in 2014
Clinical psychology journals
2014 establishments in the United States